The Roman Catholic Diocese of Alleppey is a diocese centered on the city of Alleppey in the Ecclesiastical province of Trivandrum in India. It lies along the Arabian Sea between the dioceses of Cochin and Quilon, covering an area of 333 square kilometers.
These are the most important churches in the Diocese of Alappuzha.  1. Arthunkal BasilicaArthunkal – (Basilica Pilgrimage Center), 2. Thumpoli Thumpoly Church -(Marian Pilgrimage Center), 3. Kattoor Forane Church, 4. Latin Church Cathedral, 5. Vanaswargam Church, 6. Punnapra-Paravoor Churches, 7. Pollathai Church, 8. St. Antony's shrine alleppey..The main churches in the diocese are Manakkodam Church.

Important Pilgrimage Shrines /Churches in the Diocese of Alleppey (Alappuzha).

These are two of the most important pilgrimage churches in the Diocese of Alleppey .  1. Arthunkal BasilicaArthunkal-(Basilica of St. Sebastian's), 2. Thumpoli St. Thomas Church, Thumpoly ChurchThumpoly-(Marian Pilgrimage Shrine/Church of the Immaculate Conception).

History
The Diocese of Alleppey was erected by the 1952 papal bull Ea Redemptoris Verba of Pope Pius XII, which divided the northern territory of the old Cochin Diocese at the Kuthiathodu Canal Line. The territory to the north of that line now belongs to the Cochin Diocese and the territory to the south to the Diocese of Alleppey. The executorial decree of 8 September 1952 assigned to the Diocese of Alleppey and Cochin respectively a supplementary personal jurisdiction over certain parishes in the territory of the other. This decree was approved by the Sacred Congregation for the Propagation of the Faith on 24 September 1952 and became effective on 11 October 1952.

The boundaries are defined as: to the north, the Kuthiathodu Canal Line; to the south, a straight line from the curve of the Pampa River at Viyapuram to the Arabian Sea through Thottappally; to the east, a line along the middle of the Vembanadu Lake continued to the south of the Pallathuruthy Canal to Viyapuram; to the west, the Arabian Sea.

The area assigned to the diocese comprises roughly the area of the Jesuit Mission of St. Andre of Muteret. The Jesuits started mission work among the St Thomas Christians in this area about 1570. One of the most influential Jesuit missionaries who worked in this area was Fr. Giacomo Fenicio, an Italian who was Vicar of St Andrew's Church at Arthunkal, from 1584 to 1602 and again from 1619 until his death in 1632. He was a pioneer in Indology.

A century of intense mission work of the Jesuits increased the size of Christian community from Cochin to Purakkad and built several churches, notable among them being St. Andrew's Arthukal (1581). St. Michael's Kattor(1590), St. Thomas Thumpoly (1600) and St. George's Manakodam (1640). A few other churches built during this period were destroyed by wars or by sea erosion.

After the Schism of the Coonan Cross, the St. Thomas Christians of the Mission of St. Andre were reconciled to Rome by Msgr. Giuseppe Sebastiani during his second tour of Malabar in 1662.

Even after the capture of Cochin by the Dutch, the Jesuits continued to look after the Christians of this area until the middle of the 18th century. The mission was then taken over by the Carmelite Missionaries and remained under the Vicariate of Verapoly until the restoration of the old Cochin diocese in 1886.

In 1570 Jesuit missionaries started to work in the area. Five churches were built:
Holy Cross Purakkad (1570)
St. Andrew's church Arthunkal (1581)
St. Michael's church Kattor (1590)
Holy Cross Kadakkarappally (1620)
St. George Manakodam (1640 – rebuilt).

On 19 June 1952 the Diocese of Alleppey was created by a division of the Diocese of Cochin

Bishops 
There have been four Latin Rite bishops of Alleppey:
 Bishop Michael Arattukulam (1952–1984)
 Bishop Peter Michael Chenaparampil (1984–2001)
 Bishop Stephen Athipozhiyil (2001–2019)
Bishop James Raphel Anamparambil (2019 – present)

Institutions 
St Antony's Orphanage, founded by the Diocese of Alappuzha, is located opposite the Mount Carmel Cathedral, Alappuzha. More than ten thousands of alumni's are working in different parts of the world from this organization which was firmly established by Servant of God Mgr. Reynolds Purackal and Former Bishop Michael Arattukulam.

Saints and causes for canonisation
 Ven. Fernanda Riva
 Servant of God Sebastian Lawrence Casimir Presentation Valiyathayil
 Servant of God Reynolds Purackal

References

External links
 
 GCatholic.org 
 Catholic Hierarchy 

Roman Catholic dioceses in India
Christian organizations established in 1952
Roman Catholic dioceses and prelatures established in the 20th century
1952 establishments in India
Dioceses in Kerala
Organisations based in Alappuzha
Churches in Alappuzha district